Post Tropical is the second full-length album by the Irish singer-songwriter James Vincent McMorrow. It marks a move away from the largely acoustic indie folk of his 2010 debut Early in the Morning, towards a more soulful direction, and the inclusion of electronic instruments such as a Roland TR-808, brass<ref name="mir">Ward, James. "Likely forecast looks as if Post Tropical will go down a storm". Irish Daily Mirror, January 10, 2014. Retrieved January 11, 2014.</ref> and strings, combined with hip-hop beats and 1960s soul influences. The album was preceded in October 2013 by the single and album opening track "Cavalier". The single's video was directed by Irish director Aoife McArdle, one of three short films she made for the album."Aoife McArdle". Slate.ie. Retrieved January 11, 2014.

Asked about the dramatic change in direction, McMorrow admitted that he consciously sought to move away from the sound of his debut, and had no interest in repeating himself. He believes that musicians have a responsibility "to make new and interesting things. And not just go, 'Well that works, so I'm just gonna...'"

The song "Glacier" was included in a Spanish Christmas Lottery ('El Gordo') advert, aired in November 2014, in which someone who hadn't bought a lottery ticket from the bar he always went to, tears up when the barman charges him with 21 euros; "1 for the coffee and 20 for this lottery ticket".

Recording
The album was recorded in 2013 in the small desert town of Tornillo, 55 miles south of El Paso in Texas. The studio is located on a pecan farm, and McMorrow found the location "the most surreal place to work", and one that helped add to the tone of the album and inspire his creativity. He said "I think it's kind of engrained in the record, more than any pinpointed thing. I can hear the hot bedded air in this part. You can hear the birds in the pianos."

Critical receptionPost Tropical has been met with generally positive reviews. At Alternative Press, Mischa Pearlman rated the album four stars, writing that "his half-raspy, half-angelic vocals repeat in icy desperation", and this "makes you want to freeze to death." In addition, Pearlman noting that on the album he "demonstrates both his versatility and magnificence by wrapping his voice around 10 delicate but different songs." On January 10, Tony Clayton-Lea of The Irish Times described "McMorrow's falsetto voice, which is used to such good effect that you're sometimes left almost breathless" and wondered if it marked "an album of the Year so early into 2014". Writing in The Guardian, Harriet Gibsone describes an "incredibly beautiful record...woozy Americana", and a sound "so sweetly sentimental it makes Alt-J sound like NWA".

A number of critics have drawn comparison to the experimentation of James Blake and Bon Iver's second album.Lamont, Tom. "Songwriter James Vincent McMorrow stuns on 'Post Tropical'". The Observer, January 7, 2014. Retrieved January 11, 2014.

Commercial performance
In the United States, the album debuted at No. 76 on Billboard'' 200, and No. 20 on Top Rock Albums for charts dated February 1, 2014, selling 5,000 copies in the first week. The album has sold 18,000 copies in the US as of August 2016.

Track listing

Chart positions

Release history

References

2014 albums
James Vincent McMorrow albums
Albums recorded at Sonic Ranch